Tom Moosmayer (born 1 October 1979) is a Belgian footballer who spent his entire career in Germany and currently plays for FC Roetgen.

References

External links

1979 births
Living people
People from Eupen
Belgian footballers
Alemannia Aachen players
Wuppertaler SV players
Rot Weiss Ahlen players
Kickers Offenbach players
2. Bundesliga players
3. Liga players
Association football midfielders
Footballers from Liège Province